Punchbowl Bus Company is an Australian bus company operating services in Sydney Region 5, servicing the Hurstville, Roselands, Bankstown, Strathfield and surrounding suburbs. It also operates bus services in Goulburn and Crookwell in the Southern Tablelands as PBC Goulburn and PBC Crookwell.

History

Before 1960 

Punchbowl Bus Co (PBC) started off as DeLuxe Bus Service run by PM (Pat) Geoghegan in 1943. 
July 1943 Route 188 Punchbowl - Mortdale transferred from Boatwright.
29 April 1946 Route 29 Peakhurst - Hurstville commenced
May 1946 Route 28 Punchbowl - Hurstville transferred from Leach and Mallam
18 August 1947 route 33 Punchbowl - Hurstville commenced and route 36 Punchbowl - Mortdale split from route 188.
Late 1947 DeLuxe incorporated as Punchbowl Bus Co.
30 June 1952 Routes 28 and 33 transferred to Narwee Bus Co.
1956 Geoghehan died and Miss P Fitzpatrick took over.
January or February 1957 route 140 Riverwood - Lugarno separated from route 36.
October 1958 All routes transferred to owners of Narwee Bus Co / GP Bus Co.

GP Bus Co/Narwee Bus Co.
Owned by WH Griffin, CV Griffin and FS (Fred) Pobje. GP are the initial of Griffin and Pobje.
Buses owned by GP were signwritten Narwee Bus Co suggesting a close relation between these two entities.
Believed to have started 30 June 1952 when routes 28 and 33 were transferred from PBC to one of these entities.
11 May 1955 Routes 4 Greenacre - Bankstown, 189 Punchbowl - Bankstown and 190 Greenacre -  Punchbowl were transferred from XL Transport to GP Bus Co.
October 1958 Owners of Narwee Bus Co / GP Bus Co took over PBC adopting the Punchbowl Bus Co name and livery for the full operation but using the Narwee Bus Co depot. However between 1958 and 1992 various timetables were still issued in the Narwee/GP names.

Since 1960

By 1961, weekday routes 4 and 190 were combined to operate as route 4 between Bankstown and Punchbowl. Sunday route 190 trips between Punchbowl and Rookwood Cemetery finished up either at Easter or Anzac Day 1961.

In 1967, routes 4 and 28 were combined into route 244, operating between Bankstown and Hurstville via Chullora, Greenacre, Punchbowl and Roselands to give residents in the Greenacre/Chullora area direct access to the new Roselands Shopping Centre. Later when Punchbowl Bus Company took over route 37 Punchbowl - Bankstown, this route was integrated with route 33 Punchbowl - Hurstville to operate between Bankstown and Hurstville via Punchbowl and Roselands. During the late 1960s route 189 was extended from Punchbowl to Roselands, Riverwood and Lugarno replacing route 140, which initially operated between Riverwood and Lugarno. In January 1992, Revesby Bus & Coach Service's route 26 was replaced by an extension of route 188 from Punchbowl to Bankstown, and route 36 was amended to travel along the route of 26 at the Punchbowl end. In 1989 route 108 was purchased from Southtrans. 

In August 1997, the routes were renumbered into the Sydney wide scheme, including minor changes to routes. The new routes were:
940 replacing 29 and 33
941 replacing 244
942 replacing 189
943 replacing 29 and 108
944 replacing 29 and 36
945 replacing 188

In April 1998, Punchbowl Bus Co purchased Canterbury Bus Lines with routes 450 Hurstville - Strathfield and 451 Roselands - Campsie. Route 451 was extended to Hurstville later that year when part of route 947 was acquired from Saints creating a direct service from Hurstville to Campsie. The remainder of route 947 to Ramsgate was taken over by Southtrans. 

In December 2004, route 74/106 Hurstville - Kyle Bay and Connells Point was taken over from Harris Park Transport (renumbered 953) and 954 Hurstville - Hurstville Grove and Oatley from Moore's Tours. In July 2005 routes 446 Roselands Shopping Centre - Kogarah and 447 Belmore - Greenacre were taken over from Pleasure Tours.

In March 2010, Punchbowl Bus Company implemented another route numbering reconfiguration as part of the integrated transport network planning process. This was done in order to provide more frequent and direct services. As a result, routes 447 and 451 were discontinued and many of the other routes modified. Several new routes were established, including the 939, 946 and 955. Punchbowl Bus Company also introduced the S14, a new service between Lakemba and Mount Lewis.

Network changes from 26 November 2017 saw route 944 truncated to run between Bankstown and Mortdale, as well as route 450 now only running between Strathfield and Hurstville and route 946 now only running between Bankstown and Roselands. On 1 March 2018, Nightride service N20 was extended to continue into Town Hall via Sydney Airport instead of terminating at Rockdale.

Operations
The company operations are divided into three brands:
Punchbowl Bus Company - for Sydney services
PBC Goulburn
PBC Crookwell

Since 2005, Punchbowl's services have formed Sydney Bus Region 5. In August 2013, Punchbowl successfully tendered to operate Region 5 for another five years from July 2014. Punchbowl for many years also operated a coach charter operation in Sydney. This had ceased by 2012 but still carries on with local charters using existing city buses in the fleet.

In November 2008, Punchbowl purchased Goulburn Bus Service using the name PBC Goulburn followed in October 2009 by neighbouring Noack's Bus Service. The runs of Crookwell Bus Service were taken over on 20 November 2017, using the name PBC Crookwell.

Depots
Punchbowl Bus Company has two depots. The main depot located at 56 Hannans Road, Riverwood, was the original depot of the Narwee Bus Company. A secondary depot operates from 187-189 Bonds Road, Riverwood. The former secondary depot was located at 60 Belmore Road, Punchbowl and closed when the new Bonds Road depot opened. The Hannans Road depot can fit around 50 - 52 vehicles and the Bonds Road depot can fit around 23 -25 vehicles at maximum capacity.

Fleet
As of July 2022, the fleet consists of 74 buses.  

Until the late 1980s, Punchbowl Bus Company were a loyal Leyland buyer. Following their withdrawal from the market, Hino, MAN, Scania and Volvos have been purchased. 

Punchbowl Bus Company operated Denning and later Mercedes-Benz and MAN coaches in its charter division.

From its foundation in 1952, the fleet livery was red and cream. In 2010, the Transport for NSW white and blue livery began to be applied on the Sydney bus fleet. There is only one bus on route service which still wears the Punchbowl Bus Co. livery, m/o 809. All other vehicles in the Punchbowl Bus Co. livery are now used on charter work, train replacement etc. PBC Goulburn and PBC Crookwell fleet continues to bear the Punchbowl Bus Co. livery.

Ticketing
Since 16 July 2014, all buses used for Sydney services have been equipped to accept the Opal card ticketing system.

References

External links

Punchbowl Bus Company website
PBC Goulburn website
PBC Crookwell website
Bus Australia gallery
Showbus gallery

Bus transport in Sydney
Bus companies of New South Wales
Transport companies established in 1952
Australian companies established in 1952